Kembla Grange is a suburb west of Berkeley, in the City of Wollongong.

The Kembla Grange Racecourse and its railway station are located there.

History

Kembla Grange takes its name from Mount Kembla, which was believed to be an Aboriginal term "wild game hunting".

The area around what is known as Kembla Grange was originally known as Dunlop Vale after John Dunlop Vale. In 1829, Governor Ralph Darling instructed Surveyor Knapp to survey 10 lots of 100 acres for war veterans.

In 1840, Gerard Gerard named the parcel "Kembla Grange". In the same decade, it became a leading area for dairy farming.

In the late 19th century, the railway line linked through Kembla Grange and with the opening of the railway station in 1890, its railway platform was mentioned in timetables.

On 18th December 1976, the Kembla Grange Racecourse opened when the Illawarra Turf Club was formed and conducted its first racemeeting.

References

Suburbs of Wollongong